Ben Toolis (born 31 March 1992) is a Scottish rugby union player who last played for Edinburgh Rugby in the United Rugby Championship. Toolis represented Scotland at an international level.

Early life
Born in Brisbane, Australia, he played for Australia Youth (U18) and Junior (U20) in volleyball games and had a background of rugby. Ben was in the Australian National Rugby Academy squad and played in the IRB Pacific Nations Cup with his twin brother Alex. Subsequently, he was able to make it to the Premier Grade semi-finals in 2012 and 2013, a privilege he shared with Alex.

Professional rugby career 
In 2013 Ben and Alex signed for Edinburgh Rugby, joining the club's Elite Development Player Programme. Coach Stevie Scott stated: "They're both very athletic and mobile, which are important attributes in the modern game."

Ben's first try for Edinburgh came during the European Challenge Cup semi-final thrashing of Newport Gwent Dragons in April 2015.

International career 
Although born in Australia, Toolis is eligible to represent Scotland as his mother, Linda, is from Carluke in Lanarkshire. After a good run of form for his club Toolis was called up to the Scotland squad for the 2015 Six Nations Championship, going on to make his international debut against Italy. He has subsequently played in two victories for Scotland over the country of his birth.

References

External links 
 profile at Edinburgh Rugby
 profile at Scottish Rugby

Edinburgh Rugby players
1992 births
Living people
Rugby union players from Brisbane
Australian people of Scottish descent
Scotland international rugby union players
London Irish players
Rugby union locks
Scottish rugby union players
Hanazono Kintetsu Liners players